A by-election was held in the Faleata West constituency in Samoa on 14 May 2010. The by-election was precipitated by the disqualification from the Legislative Assembly of Lealailepule Rimoni Aiafi for joining the Tautua Samoa Party. It was won by the Human Rights Protection Party's Ale Vena Ale.

Irregularities
On 30 March 2010, HRPP candidate Ale Vena Ale complained to the Electoral Commissioner that non-resident voters were being registered for the by-election in the village of Vaitele.

On 3 April the village council of Toamua decided that it was compulsory for village residents to vote for Ale Vena.

Candidates
 Lealailepule Rimoni Aiafi (Tautua Samoa Party)
 Ale Vena Ale (Human Rights Protection Party)
 Ulugia Petelo (Human Rights Protection Party)

Results

References

By-elections to the Legislative Assembly of Samoa
2010 elections in Oceania
2010 in Samoa